DeLawrence  Grant, Jr. (born November 18, 1979) is a former American football linebacker who played college football at Oregon State and was drafted by the Oakland Raiders in the third round of the 2001 NFL Draft.

College career
DeLawrence Grant was a defensive end for Oregon State University.

Professional career
Grant was selected by the Raiders in the third round of the 2001 NFL Draft and has played five years for them. Grant began his career as a defensive end before being converted to linebacker.

He played sparingly as a rookie in 2001, before starting at left end for most of the Raiders' Super Bowl season in 2002. That season Delawrence was ranked top 10.

That offseason, he was released by the Raiders for salary cap reasons, but was later re-signed. Due to an injury, he played only half the season in 2005, missing most of the middle portion.

One of the stranger aspects of Grant's star-crossed Raiders career is his continual switch in uniform number. He started out as No. 95, then switched to No. 99 when a more experienced player, Sam Adams, was signed and was issued the jersey. He then switched to No. 59 (the reverse of his prior No. 95) after moving to linebacker, since numbers in the 50s were thought of as linebackers' numbers.

References

External links
Database Football: DeLawrence Grant stats
NFL.com bio

1979 births
American football linebackers
Living people
Oakland Raiders players
Oregon State Beavers football players